The 2017–18 Akron Zips men's basketball team represented the University of Akron during the 2017–18 NCAA Division I men's basketball season. The Zips, led by first-year head coach John Groce, played their home games at the James A. Rhodes Arena as members of the East Division of the Mid-American Conference. They finished the season 14–18, 6–12 in MAC play to finish in last place in the East Division. In the MAC tournament, they defeated Western Michigan in the first round before losing to Eastern Michigan in the quarterfinals.

Previous season
The Zips finished the 2016–17 season 27–9, 14–4 in MAC play to win the MAC East Division and MAC overall regular season championship. They defeated Eastern Michigan and Ball State to advance to the championship game of the MAC tournament where they lost to Kent State, losing in the championship game for the second consecutive year. As a regular season conference champion who failed to win their conference tournament, they received an automatic bid to the National Invitation Tournament where they defeated Houston in the first round before losing to Texas–Arlington.

Following the season, head coach Keith Dambrot left the school to accept the head coaching position at Duquesne. On April 5, 2017, the school hired former Ohio and Illinois head coach John Groce to replace Dambrot.

Offseason

Recruiting class of 2017

Roster

Schedule and results

|-
!colspan=9 style=| Non-conference regular season

|-
!colspan=9 style=| MAC regular season

|-
!colspan=9 style=| MAC tournament

References

Akron Zips men's basketball seasons
Akron